The largescaled rasbora (Rasbora paucisqualis) is a species of ray-finned fish in the genus Rasbora. It is a lotic species found in the Mekong basin and in Malaysia.

References 

Rasboras
Fish of the Mekong Basin
Fish of Cambodia
Fish of Laos
Fish of Malaysia
Taxa named by Ernst Ahl
Fish described in 1935